Ronald Tudor Davies (25 May 1942 – 24 May 2013) was a Welsh footballer who played as a centre forward. He spent most of his career with Southampton in the Football League First Division, and also for the Welsh national team.

Born in Holywell, Flintshire, Wales, he went to the same school as the Spurs defender Mike England, whom he played alongside in internationals for Wales. He was known as a header of the ball and was the top goal scorer in Division 1 for two seasons (1966–1968). In his first season at Southampton, he scored 12 goals across 10 consecutive league games.

His younger brother Paul was an Arsenal youth player who went on to play for Charlton Athletic.

Early career
After an unsuccessful trial with Blackburn Rovers, Davies signed his first professional contract in July 1959 with Chester where he was made to hurdle wearing army boots – training, he later claimed, which gave him his strength when jumping for crosses.

He made his debut in a 5–0 defeat to Workington in March 1960 and the following two seasons would see the club finish bottom of the Football League. However, Davies had a strong strike rate and was a regular in the team. Following a rare spell out of favour that saw him placed on the transfer list, his reply was to score four goals in a 6–1 win against Southport in October 1962. Port Vale manager Norman Low offered £7,000 plus Terry Miles for Davies, but the deal fell through after the Vale directors vetoed the move. He went instead to Luton Town for a fee of £12,200 and, when they were relegated, he moved on again to Norwich City.

Norwich City
His transfer to Norwich in September 1963 involved a fee of £35,000. He averaged more than a goal every other game for Norwich, starting with a goal in each of his first four matches. He went on to score 30 goals that season in a side who finished 17th in the English Football League, Division Two. In the next two seasons he scored 15 and 21 before being sold to Southampton for £55,000.

He made his international debut at the age of 21 for Wales on 15 April 1964 in a 3–2 defeat against Northern Ireland.

Southampton
Ted Bates had spent a then club record £55,000 for Davies as the club prepared to face their inaugural season in the top division. Already an established Welsh international, Davies scored 12 goals in 10 consecutive League games, and ended that season having scored 37 goals in 41 games, more than any other player in the division. The club retained their place in the division. The first of his 134 League goals for Southampton was on 27 August 1966 at Bloomfield Road, as his club beat hosts Blackpool 3–2. In front of a crowd of 15,258, he lobbed Tony Waiters. "The 'keeper came off his line – way out of the box. I was 35 yards out and I couldn't believe it. I just knocked it over his head."

He was joint top goalscorer in the division in the following season, 1967–68, along with George Best. On 16 August 1969, he scored four goals, all headers, in a match against Manchester United at Old Trafford, after which Matt Busby said that Davies had no peer in Europe.

By the 1970s, many clubs had learned how to cope with Davies' aerial power, and he was often neutralised by defenders playing the man rather than the ball. A series of injuries reduced his effectiveness, and his scoring was reduced. By 1973, he was unable to retain a regular place in the first team.

Later career
He left Southampton for Portsmouth in April 1973, and scored 18 goals for them in 59 games. Manchester United then signed him in November 1974 but his playing opportunities were limited. He left for Millwall a year later after making eight appearances for United, all of them from the substitute's bench. He appeared three times for Millwall.

His final international appearance was on 11 May 1974 in a 2–0 defeat against England, bringing his total number of caps to 29, with 9 goals scored.

Davies returned to Southampton to live, but then moved to Los Angeles to play for the Los Angeles Aztecs alongside George Best. When the 1976 North American Soccer League season ended, Davies returned to the UK for the winter and had a five-month spell (October 1976 to February 1977) playing in the Southern League for Dorchester Town. He then had two further seasons with the Aztecs with a modest scoring record before moving on to the Tulsa Roughnecks in 1978 and the Seattle Sounders in 1979. He also coached at local schools in LA and Florida.

Davies subsequently moved to Albuquerque, New Mexico, where he lived in a motor-home and worked in the construction industry. He lost touch with many of his former playing colleagues. Contact was re-established in 2006 when there were discussions of an appeal for support to enable him to have a hip replacement. He said that his hip had been damaged due to the wear and tear of his playing days and that he could not afford the necessary surgery and would soon have to stop working. The appeal organised on his behalf by fans of Southampton was successful, enabling him to have two hip replacements and providing a surplus for his general use. However, following the death of his American partner, Chris, in 2009 he once again became reclusive.

Davies' caricatures of his teammates often featured in the local press.

Death
Davies died in Albuquerque on 24 May 2013.

References

External links
Wales international career at Sporting Heroes
Southampton career at Sporting Heroes
Daily Telegraph obituary
Guardian obituary
Obituary in The Independent

1942 births
People from Holywell, Flintshire
Sportspeople from Flintshire
2013 deaths
Welsh footballers
Welsh expatriate footballers
English Football League players
First Division/Premier League top scorers
Wales international footballers
Blackburn Rovers F.C. players
Chester City F.C. players
Luton Town F.C. players
Manchester United F.C. players
Norwich City F.C. players
Portsmouth F.C. players
Southampton F.C. players
North American Soccer League (1968–1984) players
Seattle Sounders (1974–1983) players
Tulsa Roughnecks (1978–1984) players
Los Angeles Aztecs players
Expatriate soccer players in the United States
Welsh expatriate sportspeople in the United States
Association football forwards